Thomas Holt (1835–1889) was an American architect active in the second half of the 19th century.

Life and career

Holt was born in Bethel, Maine, in 1835, to carpenter Jacob D. Holt (1807–1865) and Hannah White (1794–1892). He graduated from Gould Academy in Bethel.

It is believed that Holt established a firm with contractors Moses C. Foster and Cyrus Buck, but had started out on his own by 1857, for he was advertising his services in the Bethel Courier. Buck died in the Civil War in 1865, aged 24 or 25, while fighting for the Union Army.

In 1860, Holt designed the Central Parish Church in Yarmouth, Maine, which still stands on the town's Main Street, at the head of Portland Street, and is now on the National Register of Historic Places. It is one of only four surviving examples of his work on churches in Maine.

Between 1871 and 1876, he served as chief engineer of the Maine Central Railroad, for whom he designed bridges and buildings, in addition to undertaking surveys for potential new lines.

In 1876, he moved to California, where he continued in architecture but also branched into mining and lumbering.

Death
Holt died while in the western United States on November 9, 1889, with sources saying it was either after catching pneumonia in a blizzard in Nevada or while in San Francisco, California.

Selected notable works
Central Parish Church, Yarmouth, Maine (1860)
Portland and Kennebec railway station, Augusta, Maine (1865)

References

1835 births
1889 deaths
19th-century American architects
Architects from Maine
People from Bethel, Maine